Artur Paweł Michalkiewicz (born 11 September 1977 in Wrocław) is a Polish Greco-Roman wrestler who competed in the 2008 Summer Olympics in Beijing and in the 2000 Summer Olympics.

At the 2008 Summer Olympics he finished 16th in the middleweight competition (84 kg) in wrestling.

External links
 

1977 births
Living people
Olympic wrestlers of Poland
Wrestlers at the 2000 Summer Olympics
Polish male sport wrestlers
Wrestlers at the 2008 Summer Olympics
Sportspeople from Wrocław
20th-century Polish people
21st-century Polish people